The 1978 NCAA Division III football season, part of college football in the United States organized by the National Collegiate Athletic Association at the Division III level, began in August 1978, and concluded with the NCAA Division III Football Championship in December 1978 at Garrett–Harrison Stadium in Phenix City, Alabama.

Conference standings

Conference champions

Postseason
The 1978 NCAA Division III Football Championship playoffs were the sixth annual single-elimination tournament to determine the national champion of men's NCAA Division III college football. The championship game was held at Garrett-Harrison Stadium in Phenix City, Alabama for the sixth consecutive year. Like the previous three championships, eight teams competed in this edition.

Playoff bracket

See also
1978 NCAA Division I-A football season
1978 NCAA Division I-AA football season
1978 NCAA Division II football season
1978 NAIA Division I football season
1978 NAIA Division II football season

References